Gabriele Mascazzini (born 9 March 1995) is an Italian-born, Swiss footballer who currently plays as a forward for South WestPhoenix FC.

Club career
Mascazzini started his career with Swiss lower-league side FC Mendrisio, before moving to professional outfit FC Lugano in 2017, where he featured solely for their under-21 side. After that, he played for Stallion Laguna in the Philippines.

Career statistics

Club

Notes

References

1995 births
Living people
Swiss men's footballers
Association football forwards
FC Lugano players
Expatriate soccer players in Australia
Stallion Laguna F.C. players
Swiss expatriate footballers
Expatriate footballers in the Philippines